The Rapid River is a river in Algoma District, Ontario, Canada. A road, which begins at Highway 129 north of the river's mouth, parallels the majority of the river to Seymour Lake.

See also
List of rivers of Ontario

References

Rivers of Algoma District